Lophozozymus pulchellus is a species of crab in the family Xanthidae.

Description
The carapace contains some granular crests, and has a pattern of fine red lines. The anterior area of the dorsal surface of the carapace is somewhat granular. There is a large, transverse red band on the ambulatory legs. These legs are cylindrical in shape, the superior margin containing a fine crest.

Distribution
This species is known to occur in:
New Caledonia (type locality
Red Sea
Zanzibar
Dar es Salaam
Europa Island 
Seychelles
Chagos Archipelago
Sri Lanka
Japan: Yoron-jima, Ishigaki-jima, and Taketomi-jima, Kakeroma-jima
Paracel Islands
New Caledonia
Hawaii
Line Islands

References

External links
 Image of a 30-cent (Australian) postage stamp from Cocos (Keeling) Islands

Xanthoidea
Crustaceans described in 1867